Mount Flånuten is a mountain  high extending as a massif between Livdebotnen Cirque and Vindegghallet Glacier, in the Humboldt Mountains of Queen Maud Land, Antarctica. It was discovered and photographed by the Third German Antarctic Expedition, 1938–39. It was mapped by Norway from air photos and surveys of the Sixth Norwegian Antarctic Expedition, 1956–60, and named Flånuten (the flat summit).

References 

Mountains of Queen Maud Land
Humboldt Mountains (Antarctica)